The 1972 United States Senate election in Michigan was held on November 7, 1972. Incumbent Republican U.S. Senator and Senate Minority Whip Robert P. Griffin ran for re-election to a second term, won reelection defeating the Democratic candidate, and Michigan Attorney General Frank J. Kelley by 6%. Despite President Richard Nixon’s landslide victory in Michigan and the rest of the country, Griffin’s margin of victory decreased from the previous election.

, this was the last time that the Republicans have won Michigan’s Class 2 Senate seat, as well as the last time that a member of the party has been re-elected to either of the state’s Senate seats.

General election

Candidates
Thomas D. Dennis Jr. (Communist)
Patrick V. Dillinger (American Independent)
 Robert P. Griffin, incumbent U.S. Senator since 1967 (Republican)
Barbara Halpert (Human Rights)
 Frank J. Kelley, Michigan Attorney General (Democratic)
Linda Norquist (Socialist Workers)
James Sim (Socialist Labor)

Results

See also 
 1972 United States Senate elections

References 

Michigan
1972
1972 Michigan elections